Triploblasty is a condition of the gastrula in which there are three primary germ layers: the ectoderm, mesoderm, and endoderm. Germ cells are set aside in the embryo at the blastula stage, which are incorporated into the gonads during organogenesis. The germ layers form during gastrulation of the blastula. The term triploblast may refer to any egg cell in which the blastoderm splits into three layers.

All bilaterians, the animals with bilaterally symmetrical embryos, are triploblastic. Other animal taxa, the ctenophores, placozoans and cnidarians, are diploblastic, meaning their embryos contain only two germ layers. Sponges are even less developmentally specialized, lacking both true tissues and organs.

The earliest triploblasts are thought to have evolved from the diploblasts some time in the Proterozoic, establishing themselves as a group prior to the diversification of them during the Cambrian explosion.

See also

References

Animal developmental biology